The Soling South American Championship is an International sailing regatta in the Soling organized by the International Soling Association under auspiciën of World Sailing. The initiative for this event was taken, inspired by the success of the Soling European Championship in 1971 to promote Soling sailing in the South America.
Since then about 40 Soling South American Championship were held. The popularity grew during the Olympic period of the Soling. After that era the event continued and is still reasonable successful.
The Soling South American Championship is an "Open" event. This means that competitors from all over the world are eligible to enter.

Editions

Medalists

References

Soling South American Championships
Central and South American championships in sailing